Fusiturricula lavinoides is a species of sea snail, a marine gastropod mollusk in the family Drilliidae.

Description
The size of an adult shell varies between 10 mm and 14 mm.

Distribution
This species occurs in the demersal zone of Brazil.

References

 Olsson, Axel A. "The Miocene of Northern Costa Rica." Bulletins of American Paleontology 9.39 (1922): 1–168.

External links
 

lavinoides
Gastropods described in 1922